The Virginia Commonwealth University School of Business is the business school of Virginia Commonwealth University, a public research university in Richmond, Virginia.

History
VCU School of Business has grown from an initial class of 11 students to a student body of nearly 4,000.

The Beginning

The School of Business opened its doors on September 22, 1937 and was known as the School of Store Service Education. Henry Hibbs, president of the Richmond Division of the College of William and Mary, had secured a federal grant to train executives for the growing retail sector. The school trained educators to teach salesmanship and retailing as well as department store training programs.

1940s G.I. Bill of Rights

In 1944, there were eight men enrolled full-time. By 1948, male enrollment had increased to 890 students, transforming RPI from a chiefly women's college into a true coeducational institution. This was primarily caused by the enactment of the G.I. Bill of Rights. Accounting was added as a degree and in 1946, the Department of Business Administration became the School of Business.

1958 Center for Corporate Education
In 1958, the School of Business founded the Adult Business Education Center to serve area companies through short-term courses, workshops and seminars. It is now known as the Center for Corporate Education.

1986 Experimental Economics Lab
The Experimental Economics Lab, opened in 1986 and was the first of its kind to employ the IBM PC network as  a tool for replicating actual market environments.

1994 Fast Track M.B.A. & International Business Forum

The VCU Executive M.B.A. (formerly the Fast Track Executive M.B.A.) was founded in 1994 and has attracted more than 1,000 mid-level executives and professionals. The first International Business Forum started in 1994 due to a grant from Universal Corp.

1999-2007 Campaign for the School of Business
Steven A. Markel, vice chairman of Markel Corp. and chair of the school's executive leadership committee, and William H. Goodwin Jr., president and CEO of CCA Industries Inc. and chair of the VCU School of Engineering foundation, came up with the idea to join forces and expand VCU's campus across Belvidere Street. An initial $10 million gift from Steve and Kathie Markel (the largest in school's history) and $1 milliner from Tom and Vickie Snead jump started the business campaign. The School of Business Foundation raised $51.5 million, which funded the construction of Snead Hall.

2007 Business Career Services

Prior to 2007, students were given advice and steered toward internships and jobs by faculty, the University Career Center and alumni volunteers. Integrated into Snead Hall was a dedicated space for career services catered to business students.

2008 VCU da Vinci Center

The da Vinci Center of Innovation was created. The da Vinci Center combines the VCU School of Engineering, VCU School of the Arts and the VCU School of Business into innovation teams that work on creative ways to solve business problems.

Campus
Snead Hall opened for use to the School of Business in January 2008. Along with traditional classroom and faculty offices, the 145,000 square-foot, four-story facility includes a capital markets center and trading room, central atrium with a student commons and cafe, Business and Engineering Career Center, Center for Corporate Education, auditorium, collaborative learning rooms, tiered case study classrooms and team-building breakout rooms.

The current master plan calls for an Executive Center to be built on the block that is located east of the current business building. The building is estimated to cost 65 million.

Previous locations
Ginter House (1937)- The site of the first business classes taught in the School of Store Service Education. Known to students simply as 901 S. Franklin St. The Ginter House was built from 1888-1892 and is considered the finest example of Richardsonian architecture in Virginia.
Franklin Street Gym (1950s) - RPI's first new building. The art department and the secretarial science department of the School of Business was housed here. The director of the School of Business also had his office in the new gym.
School of Business Building (1972) - Currently known as Grace E. Harris Hall, the School of Business Building was a 90 classroom building opened in 1972 thanks to $3.917 million in funding from the Commonwealth of Virginia.

Rankings
VCU MBA is included in the Princeton Review's "The Best 294 Business Schools: 2012 Edition." Schools selected for inclusion in the book were determined to be the country's best institutions for earning an MBA

References

Virginia Commonwealth University
Educational institutions established in 1946
1946 establishments in Virginia